Olbasa was a town in the western part of ancient Pisidia between Adada and Zorzela. It later received a Roman colony under the name of Colonia Iulia Augusta.

Its site is located near Belenli, in Burdur Province.

References

Populated places in Pisidia
Former populated places in Turkey
Coloniae (Roman)
History of Burdur Province